The Sindh Irrigated Agriculture Productivity Enhancement Project (SIAPEP) is a provincial agency of the Government of Sindh in Pakistan they are improving irrigation water management at tertiary and field levels in Sindh Pakistan.

The Sindh Irrigated Agriculture Productivity Enhancement Project (SIAPEP) is a World Bank funded Project. Started in 2015 and Closed in 2021.

World Bank total project cost US$242.20 M, Commitment amount US$187.00 M to enhance Sindh agriculture productivity.

References 

Government agencies of Sindh
World Bank
Irrigation in Pakistan